Jayasri Chattopadhyay (Jayaśrī Caṭṭopādhyāya) (b. 1945) is a Sanskrit writer and Sanskrit poet from Kolkata, West Bengal, India. Her Ph.D. was on 'Lyrical Elements of the Ramayana of Valmiki' and D.lit on 'The Influence of Buddhist Avadana Literature on the literature of visvakabi Rabindranath Tagore'.

Her collection of self-composed Sanskrit poems is named Nissangah Pranyayh. The English version of this book is titled Love without attachment. She has done a CD on Nissangah Pranayah which was released at the 16th World Sanskrit Conference held in Bangkok, June 2015. Her notable Sanskrit writings are 'Asafvilasa Samiksha', 'Sanskrita Sahitye Swapna', 'Mahavastuni Ramayananubhava', 'Adhyardhasataka Samiksha', ' Mricchakatike Varsha', 'Buddhacharite Ramayana samyam', 'Jagannathasya', 'Jagadabharanam', 'Sahitye smrityaloka', 'Usha Varavarnini', and 'Devi Suktam' which were published in different Sanskrit journals.

She also edited and translated in Bengali 'Kakolukiyam' and  'Labdhapranasham', two tantras of the panchatantra. Besides Nissangah Pranayah, she also composed Sanskrit poems like 'Ratri' , ' Shilabhattarika', 'Avasara', and 'Kalikatanagarya durgapratimang prati', the English translation of which she recited at the Abhivyakti performance of Sahitya Academy held at Dibrugarh on 5 September 2015.

She was a reader at Women's Christian College, Kolkata and also taught master of Theology at the Bishop's College.

She was also a guest lecturer in Sanskrit College, Kolkata. She received Shastra Churamani Scholarship of Rashtriya Sanskrit Sangsthan and taught in Sitaram Baidic Adarsha Sanskrit Mahabidyalay.

She also taught Alamkarashastra (poetics) at the Jadavpur University Kolkata and wrote history of Sanskrit poetics in Bengali language named 'Alamkarasahityer Samriddha Itihash', published by Sanskrit Pustak Bhandar.

Recently her travel experiences have been published in the Bengali Book Bhraman Vilasir Diary.

Books
 Valmikiye Ramayane Gitikavyadharmita
 Nissanghah pranayah
 Valmikiyam Ramayanam
 Avadan Evam Rabindranath
 Buddha Charitam
 Alamkarasahityer Samriddha Itihash
 Dhwanyaloka

References

References

 Vimsa-Satabdi-Samskrita-Kavyamritam by Aviraj Rajendra Mishra
 Sanskrit Journal Ajasra
 Sanskrit Journal Samgamani
 Sanskrita Pratibha, Sahitya Academy
 Indian Literature, Sahitya Academy
 All India Oriental Conference Proceedings B.O.R.I.
 Kolkatar Kadcha in Anandabazar Patrika newspaper dated 8 March 1993
 Pardte Pardte in Anadabazar Patrika newspaper dated 27 June 1998
 Boier Desh Magazine April–June Issue 2006

I

1945 births
Living people
Academic staff of Women's Christian College, Kolkata
University of Calcutta alumni
Academic staff of the University of Calcutta
Sanskrit scholars from Bengal
20th-century Indian scholars
Indian Sanskrit scholars
Sanskrit poets
Sanskrit-language women poets
Indian women scholars
Indian lecturers
Academic staff of Jadavpur University
Indian women essayists
20th-century Indian essayists
21st-century Indian essayists
21st-century Indian non-fiction writers
Indian non-fiction writers
20th-century Indian women writers
21st-century Indian women writers
21st-century Indian writers
21st-century Bengalis
20th-century Bengalis
Bengali writers
Bengali Hindus
Sanskrit writers
Indian women poets
20th-century Indian poets
21st-century Indian poets